Hibbertia melhanioides is a species of flowering plant in the family Dilleniaceae and is endemic to north Queensland. It is a shrub with hairy foliage, oblong to elliptic or lance-shaped leaves, and yellow flowers with more than about 25 to 30 stamens and up to eight staminodes arranged around three carpels.

Description 

Taxonomy 
Hibbertia melhanioides was first formally described in 1864 by Ferdinand von Mueller in Fragmenta phytographiae Australiae from specimens collected by John Dallachy near Rockingham Bay in 1864. The specific epithet (melhanioides) means "Melhania-like".

In 1928, Karel Domin described two varieties of Hibbertia melhanioides in the journal Bibliotheca Botanica and the names are accepted by the Australian Plant Census:
 Hibbertia melhanioides var. baileyana Domin;
 Hibbertia melhanioides F.Muell. var. melhanioides.

Distribution and habitat 

See also 
 List of Hibbertia species

References 

melhanioides
Flora of Queensland
Plants described in 1864
Taxa named by Ferdinand von Mueller